The Jaguar X-Type is a front-engine, all-wheel/front-wheel drive compact executive car manufactured and marketed by Jaguar Cars from 2001 to 2009 under the internal designation X400, for a single generation, in sedan/saloon and wagon/estate body styles.  In addition to offering Jaguar's first station wagon/estate in series production, the X-Type would ultimately introduce its first diesel engine, four-cylinder engine and front-wheel drive configuration.

The X-Type was developed during the period when Jaguar was owned by Ford as a division of its Premier Automotive Group (PAG) (1999-2009) — and marked Jaguar's entry into the critical compact executive segment. The programme aimed to double the marque's worldwide sales — requiring expansion of engineering resources, factory capacity, marketing capability, sales support and service. At launch, Autocar called the X-Type "the most important Jaguar ever." 

With annual projections of 100,000 sales, the X-Type recorded a production of 350,000 over its eight year manufacturing run.

Overview
The X-Type, codenamed X400, launched in 2001 to compete in the compact executive class dominated by the rear-wheel drive BMW 3 Series and Mercedes-Benz C-Class despite Ford/Jaguar having no directly competitive platform.

Instead, the X-type used a modified version of the front-drive Ford CD132 platform shared with the contemporary Ford Mondeo — with the addition of all-wheel drive (marketed as Jaguar Traction or Jaguar Traction 4) and handling and steering engineered to minimise front-wheel drive torque-steer. Initially, the X-Type was available only with all wheel drive, using a centre differential and a compact, maintenance-free viscous coupling with a default split of 60 percent torque to the rear wheels, 40 percent to the front wheels.  Under loss of traction front or rear, the coupling could vary the front/rear torque split and could fully transfer torque to either front or rear wheels to ensure grip.  From 2005-on, X-Types used an electronically controlled transfer cases rather than the centre viscous coupling.

Despite the X-Type's importance to Jaguar and Ford's Premier Automotive Group, extensive engineering development, a different wheelbase and track, body styling and significant testing the X-Type was often described as just a "reshelled Ford Mondeo". Although in the end, just 19% of the cars origins were shared, much of which were perfectly suited components such as HVAC units hidden from view and which in no way detracted from the X400’s Jaguar heritage.

As Jaguar's first compact executive car since the Jaguar Mark 2 of 1959, the X-Type was the last Jaguar styled under the supervision of Geoff Lawson, with Wayne Burgess and Simon Butterworth as principal designers.

The four door saloon launched in 2001, and the five door estate followed in January 2004, with production of both ending in July 2009.  The estate offered a Cd of 0.32 in standard form and 0.33 in Sport trim.

Engines included either of two V6 petrol engines: 2.5 litre or 3.0 litre. In 2002, an entry level 2.1 litre V6 front wheel drive model was added. All three engines were available with either five- speed automatic or five speed manual gearboxes. The X-Type grille was slightly modified for both the 2004 and 2006 model years. The base petrol engine was a Jaguar tweaked (Ford Duratec V6) derived from the 2.5-litre that served in the Ford Mondeo, and the 3.0-litre V6 is essentially an adaptation of the base engine from the Jaguar S-Type and Lincoln LS.

Eventually, the X-Type would become available with front-wheel drive and a 2.1-litre petrol or 2.0 Turbo diesel engine. In July 2009, Jaguar Land Rover announced the end of X-Type production by the end of 2009.

Both saloon and estate configurations were manufactured at the Halewood Assembly Facility near Liverpool, renovated at a cost of $450 million.

Technical
The X-Type was based on a modified version of the Ford CD132 platform shared with the Ford Mondeo. The X-Type was initially offered as all-wheel drive only and mated to a 2.5 litre and 3.0 litre AJ-V6 petrol engine.

One notable addition to AJ-V6 engine design is the use of variable valve timing. The X-Type's petrol engine is also set apart by the use of SFI fuel injection, four valves per cylinder and featured fracture split forged powder metal connecting rods, plus a one piece cast camshaft, and has direct acting mechanical bucket (DAMB) tappets.

In 2003, the X-Type was also offered in front-wheel drive with the introduction of Jaguar’s first four-cylinder diesel engines (based on the Ford Duratorq ZSD unit from the Mondeo and Transit), and with the smaller 2.1 litre petrol V6. The six speed automatic transmission supplied on the later 2.2 litre diesel models includes Jaguar Sequential Shift.

Equipment
At the X-Type's launch, standard equipment included automatic climate control; leather upholstery; eight-way power driver's seat; 70/30 split folding rear seats; Sapele wood interior trim; tilt-and-telescope steering wheel; six-speaker, 120-watt AM/FM/CD stereo; power locks; one-touch power windows; a power tilt-and-slide glass sunroof; automatic headlights; and 16-inch alloy wheels. Later trim configurations would introduce carbon fibre dash panels Alcantara seat surfaces.

All interior wood was genuine, manufactured with veneers for the rest of the Jaguar line-up at Browns Lane’s Veneer Manufacturing Centre, including the door trim pieces on higher models, increasing the development and production costs.

The estate adds a 320-watt premium Alpine sound system, wood-and-leather steering wheel, 10-way power adjustable seats for driver and front-seat passenger, electrochromic mirrors inside and out, rain-sensing windshield wipers, a programmable garage-door opener, message centre and trip computer, Reverse Park Control, and 17-inch alloy wheels.

Estate

The estate was the first Jaguar model designed by Ian Callum. From its saloon counterpart, the design revised 420 tooled parts and 58 stampings for all components rearward of the windscreen, adding 150-pounds.

The design used a tailgate with independently-opening, strut-supported rear window, operable by key fob or dashboard located switch; roof-mounted luggage rails in chrome or black; interior luggage tie-downs; removable luggage cover; cargo net and a cargo compartment under the rear floor with a 12-volt power outlet and below that, storage for a full-size spare tyre. The rear seats could be lowered without removing their headrests, and the cargo compartment offered 16 cubic feet up to the side windows or 24 cubic feet to the headliner, with the rear seats up — or a total of 50 cubic feet with the rear seats folded.

The estate was marketed as the Sportwagon in the United States.

Facelift

The X-Type facelift debuted at the 2007 Canary Wharf Motorexpo and went on sale internationally during 2008, with United Kingdom sales from March.

The facelift featured revised front and rear fascias, new door mirrors with integrated turn indicator repeaters, the choice of a 2.2 litre diesel with particulate filter, and a new six speed automatic transmission with Jaguar Sequential Shift. The range continued to offer the 2.0 litre diesel, and two V6 petrol engines; 2.5 and 3.0 litre. In some European markets, the petrol engines were no longer marketed.

Special editions
In 2004, the Spirit limited model based on the 2.5 litre V6, featured the 'Sports Collection' pack with new spoilers and rear valance. It was followed in 2005 by the XS limited edition, which continued the sports theme, but available with a wider range of engines.

Engines

Safety and security

The X-Type was tested by Thatcham's New Vehicle Security Ratings (NVSR) organisation and achieved the following ratings:

Sales and reception
In November 2000, managing director Jonathan Browning said Jaguar's objective was to achieve annual sales of 100,000 with the car, partly by taking market share from established German rivals and partly by expanding the market segment in Jaguar's key markets.

The X-Type was Jaguar's best selling model during almost all its production run, but sales did not meet projections, peaking at 50,000 in 2003. In the United States, the car's primary market, sales dropped from 21,542 in 2004 to 10,941 in 2005. In the same year, Audi sold 48,922 A4s, BMW sold 106,950 3 Series and Mercedes-Benz sold 60,658 C-Class.

The X-Type's sharing of a modified Ford Mondeo platform (shared with the Land Rover Freelander, a small offroader which was also produced at Halewood) wasn't well received by Jaguar "purists." Notably, the Volkswagen Passat shared its platform with its compact executive class rival, the B5 Audi A4. The X-Type's limited powertrain choices affected its initial press reception.

Initially, the X-Type was only available with six cylinder petrol engines, coupled to an all-wheel drive system, resulting in poor fuel economy, while its key German rivals, the BMW 3 Series, Audi A4 and Mercedes C-Class were sold predominantly in two wheel drive form, with four cylinder petrol or diesel engines, a critical offering in the economy conscious European market. A four cylinder diesel option (only available with front wheel drive) was not offered in the X-Type until two years after its launch.

Jeremy Clarkson, then of BBC's Top Gear, lauded the X-Type, especially the 4×4 and sport versions. In two episodes, he demonstrated its capabilities in the snow, declaring that it "laughs in the face of the weatherman, the police and the AA, with their advice to stay at home". With regards to the sharing of the Ford Mondeo platform, Clarkson states that this should not put you off, stating that "genetically you are 98% identical to a halibut, but it's the 2% that makes the difference".

Other car magazine and website reviews were largely positive for the X-Type, especially during its introduction.
The X-Type used only 19% of Ford Mondeo's components, while a variety of Ford platforms, engines and components were being used by all models of the Ford Motor Company's luxury brands in that period, namely Aston Martin, Jaguar and Lincoln. In January 2008, Jaguar director of design Ian Callum said that the X-Type “was essentially designed in Detroit and presented as close as a fait accompli to reluctant designers and engineers at Jaguar's Whitley design centre."

Noted automotive designer Robert Cumberford called the X-Type's styling "an unimaginable pastiche of many past Jaguars" in the June 2001 issue of Car and Driver magazine.

Overall, due to poor sales, Jaguar lost €4,690 per vehicle produced.

Reviews
 The AA Likes: Elegant yet contemporary looks, silky smooth driving experience, petrol engines provide suitable soundtrack, high specification level as standard.Gripes: Non AWD models less fun to drive, smallish load area with all seats in place, rear seats do not fold completely flat, body-coloured grilles of Sport models spoil looks.
 Auto Express 'Ride, handling and grip are good, finding a fine balance between comfort and sporting ability, cabin is unmistakably Jaguar.''Traditional look and feel ... it's not the most spacious car in its class.'
 Auto Trader 'The Jaguar X-Type is the only luxury saloon in its class, according to its makers. And while owners of bona fide luxury cars may scoff, the X-Type has all the right ingredients: heritage, comfort and sartorial elegance.'
 CAR 'A bit of traditional Jag dynamic sensations and half-decent value will tempt some, but no amount of exterior tweaking can hide why the X-type missed its target.'
 Driving Good - Tempting prices, comfort & kit levels, dynamics.Not So Good - High running costs of petrol models, patchy reliability, old-fashioned styling.
 Honest John Positives: Compact Jaguar, smart looks and roomy load bay, V6s are four-wheel drive, diesels are quite frugal.Negatives: Not recommended for towing, uneven tyre wear on AWD V6 cars.
 Parker's Pros: Very comfortable and refined, sophisticated image, decent handling, decent boot space, good long distance cruiser.Cons: Traditional styling, cramped rear space, limited engine range, some cheap interior trim.
 RAC 'This is a car that has layers, textures and subtleties to its talents, a Jaguar that needs no preamble. It's up there with the best in the class. Just don't expect a bargain.'
 Verdict On Cars 'Average. Jag's supposed rival to the BMW 3 Series and Mercedes C-Class is fading fast. It's still a good car, but doubts as to whether it deserves the badge are growing.'
 What Car? 'Low prices and a good drive make it a real alternative to a BMW 3 Series.  [The Estate] drives just as well as the saloon version, but gives more practicality.'
 Wise Buyer's 'X-Type is sporty to drive and very comfortable, plus it has that charismatic Jaguar badge. But it's up against some fine executive cars. It majors on value for money and performance.'
 Time magazine  The 50 Worst Cars of All Time

Awards
The Jaguar X-Type won AutoWeek'''s Editors Choice Award as the Most Significant Car at the Geneva Motor Show of 2001.

Replacement

In January 2011, Jaguar said plans for successor for the X-Type were under consideration, to compete with models such as the BMW 3 Series, and to be positioned below the current XF.

The project, codenamed X760'', was set to be launched in 2015. In March 2014, Jaguar confirmed that the X-Type's replacement would be named the Jaguar XE.

References

External links

 

X-TYPE
Cars introduced in 2001
Cars discontinued in 2009
Sports sedans
Station wagons
Compact executive cars
ANCAP large family cars
Euro NCAP large family cars
All-wheel-drive vehicles
Front-wheel-drive vehicles